Anatol Stati (born October 25, 1952) is a businessman from Chişinău. In 2010, he was widely considered to be Moldova’s richest man. Stati is the founder of Ascom Group, President and chief executive officer and has served in this capacity since the founding in 1994. Between 1989 to 1994, Stati served as a Director at Decebal, a local Moldovan consumer goods trading company.

Controversy
His son, Gabriel Stati (born September 30, 1976), served as the vicepresident of Ascom Group (1999–2007). On April 9, the Moldovan Prosecutor General's Office asked Ukraine to extradite Gabriel Stati, a Moldovan businessman whom the Moldovan government accused of being involved in the organization and financing of the civil unrest. Stati was in Ukrainian custody along with another suspect, Aurel Marinescu, for their alleged "involvement in organizing an attempt to overthrow the Moldovan government." Aurel Marinescu (born 1970), was the chief bodyguard of Stati's company "Stati Holding". On April 16, the General Prosecutor's Office of Ukraine approved the extradition of Stati and Marinescu. Gabriel Stati was freed on June 18 by Chisinau Appellate Court, but he had to stay in house arrest during 30 days; his lawyer was Vlad Gribincea. But the court decided to keep in prison Aurel Marinescu. Stati and Marinescu were charged with usurping the state power and organizing mass disorders.

Family
His daughter, Nicoleta Stati (born June 15, 1981), has served as director of High School of Fine Arts "Igor Vieru" in Chişinău, since 2011.

Awards 
 Ordinul bisericesc "Ştefan cel Mare”

References

External links 
 VIP Magazin, ANATOL STATI. Magnatul petrolier
 VIP Magazin, Nicoleta Stati. Profesoara de pictură
 VIP Magazin, Gabriel Stati. Despre lumea din jurul său
 Gabriel Stati
 Gabriel Stati arrested by Ukrainian law authorities
 DECISION Application no. 19828/09 by Gabriel STATI and Aurel MARINESCU against Moldova

1952 births
People from Glodeni District
Moldovan economists
Moldovan businesspeople
Living people